Russell John Robins (21 February 1932 – 27 September 2019) was a Welsh rugby union, and professional rugby league footballer who played in the 1940s and 1950s. He played representative level rugby union (RU) for British Lions and Wales, and at club level for Pontypridd RFC, as a Lock, Flanker, or Number eight, i.e. number 4 or 5, 6 or 7, or 8, and club level rugby league (RL) for Leeds.

Background
Robins was born in Pontypridd, Wales in 1932.

He was educated at Pontypridd Grammar School. Robins worked for the National Coal Board, but after completing his national service he became a lecturer for the Army. On switching codes from rugby union he became a professional rugby league footballer. In the 1960/70s he was a maths teacher at the Army Apprentice College at Chepstow where he coached the rugby team and also played for the staff team.

International honours
Russell Robins won caps for Wales (RU) while at Pontypridd RFC in 1953 against Scotland, in 1954 against France, and Scotland, in 1955 against England, Scotland, Ireland, and France, in 1956 against England, and France, and in 1957 against England, Scotland, Ireland, and France, and won caps for British Lions (RU) while at Pontypridd RFC on the 1955 British Lions tour to South Africa against South Africa (4 matches).

References

External links
Search for "Robins" at rugbyleagueproject.org

Statistics at wru.co.uk
Club Focus, Pontypridd
Russell Robbins Player Profile
Image of Russell Robins with former referee, Cenydd Thomas
Russell Robins was an ever-present during the Lions' four-match Test series in South Africa 53 years ago
Club Focus - Pontypridd - Ex-Players

1932 births
2019 deaths
British & Irish Lions rugby union players from Wales
Footballers who switched code
Leeds Rhinos players
Rugby league players from Pontypridd
Pontypridd RFC players
Barbarian F.C. players
Rugby union flankers
Rugby union locks
Rugby union number eights
Wales international rugby union players
Welsh rugby league players
Welsh rugby union players
Rugby union players from Pontypridd